"Something New" is a song by Swedish dance music duo Axwell & Ingrosso. The song was released on 27 November 2014 (9 December worldwide) via digital download as the first single from their debut studio album More Than You Know, through Def Jam Recordings. In the US, "Something New" went to number one on the US Dance chart.

Background and release
On 26 November the song was first premiered through a commercial for the Beats by Dre Presents: #SoloSelfie ad campaign (in which the duo themselves also make a cameo appearance). The track was then published to iTunes a day later. "Something New" marks the duo's first official release under their joint moniker Axwell Λ Ingrosso.

Music videos
Two supporting videos were released for "Something New". The first one, a lyric video, was published to YouTube on 22 December 2014 through Axwell Λ Ingrosso's Vevo channel. The second video, the official video, was published on 11 February 2015. As of June 2016, the two videos have received over 30 million and 7 million views respectively.

Track listing

Credits and personnel
 Songwriters – Sebastian Ingrosso, Axel Hedfors, Vincent Pontare, Salem Al Fakir
 Vocalist – Salem Al Fakir
 Producers – Sebastian Ingrosso, Axel Hedfors
 Label: Def Jam Recordings

Chart performance

Weekly charts

Year-end charts

Certifications

Release history

See also
 List of Billboard Dance Club Songs number ones of 2015

References

2014 debut singles
2014 songs
Songs written by Axwell
Songs written by Sebastian Ingrosso
Songs written by Vincent Pontare
Songs written by Salem Al Fakir
Axwell & Ingrosso songs